Boris Spremo,  (Serbian Cyrillic: Борис Спремо; October 20, 1935 – August 21, 2017) was a Canadian photojournalist. He was the first photojournalist to receive the Order of Canada.

Career
After graduating from the Belgrade Cinematographic Institute, he moved to Canada in 1957 via Paris. He found work with The Globe and Mail from 1962 to 1966, and finished his career with the Toronto Star. The Toronto Star later called him "a legend in the business". Some of his photographs appeared in both Canadian and American magazines. He was known for his collages depicting life in Toronto.

Awards 
Spremo won many regional and international awards for his work, including a World Press Photo award, the first for a Canadian. He was named a member of the Order of Canada in 1997, by Governor General Roméo LeBlanc at Rideau Hall in Ottawa. He was the first photojournalist to receive the award.

Death 
Spremo died on August 21, 2017, in Toronto's Sunnybrook Hospital at age 81, from complications of myeloma.

Notes

References

External links
 Official site
 Toronto Star photographs on Digital Archive (Toronto Public Library)
 Boris Spremo biography 

1935 births
2017 deaths
Artists from Rijeka
Serbs of Croatia
Canadian photojournalists
Canadian people of Serbian descent
Members of the Order of Canada
Yugoslav emigrants to Canada
Deaths from multiple myeloma
Burials at Mount Pleasant Cemetery, Toronto